Kalohydnobius strigilatus is a species of round fungus beetle in the family Leiodidae. It is found in North America.

References

Citations

Sources

 Majka C, Langor D (2008). "The Leiodidae (Coleoptera) of Atlantic Canada: new records, faunal composition, and zoogeography". . ZooKeys 2: 357–402.
 Peck, Stewart B., and Joyce Cook (2009). "Review of the Sogdini of North and Central America (Coleoptera: Leiodidae: Leiodinae) with descriptions of fourteen new species and three new genera".

Further reading

 Arnett, R.H. Jr., M. C. Thomas, P. E. Skelley and J. H. Frank. (eds.). (2002). American Beetles, Volume II: Polyphaga: Scarabaeoidea through Curculionoidea. CRC Press LLC, Boca Raton, FL.
 Arnett, Ross H. (2000). American Insects: A Handbook of the Insects of America North of Mexico. CRC Press.
 Richard E. White. (1983). Peterson Field Guides: Beetles. Houghton Mifflin Company.

Leiodidae
Beetles described in 1880